XHIMT-TDT (virtual channel 7) is the flagship station and namesake of Mexico's Azteca 7 network, located in Mexico City.

History

XHIMT came to air on May 15, 1985, as part of Imevisión's relaunch of the Televisión de la República Mexicana network into a full-fledged national network comparable to its existing Canal 13 network. It took over TRM's transmitter network, with 99 repeater stations serving 72% of the population. The new Red Nacional 7 (7 National Network) was positioned as targeting the working class and rural areas, while Red Nacional 13, based from XHDF, targeted a more middle- and upper-class audience.

The insertion of a channel 7 into Mexico City required a shuffle of frequencies in neighboring areas, with stations in Mexico City, Toluca and on Altzomoni moving to accommodate the last VHF station in the nation's capital.

From 1990 to 1993, Imevisión consolidated the programming of the channel 7 and 13 networks; this ended when both were privatized and Televisión Azteca was formed.

Digital television

Digital subchannels 
The station's digital channel is multiplexed:

On March 20, 2017, Azteca Noticias, an all-news channel, was replaced with the new A+ local service. Azteca Noticias moved to XHTVM-TDT 40.2.

Analog-to-digital conversion
In 2007, TV Azteca began testing its HD channel, but with different programming to analog. The HD channel had films, documentaries and some series, along with the news and a select few Azteca HD productions (such as soccer games). This, however, was not permitted under the digital television transition which required that digital companions carry the same programs as their analog counterparts.

In 2010, XHIMT-TDT began transmitting a direct Azteca 7 HD feed. 4:3 programs were stretched to fill the 16:9 space.

On December 17, 2015, at 12:00 a.m., XHIMT analog channel 7 ceased broadcasts, as part of the federally mandated transition from analog to digital television.

Repeaters

XHIMT-TDT has eight direct repeaters:

|-

|-

|-

|-

|-

|-

|-

|}

Programming

Prime time

References

Azteca 7 transmitters
Television stations in Mexico City
Spanish-language television stations in Mexico
Television channels and stations established in 1985
1985 establishments in Mexico